Brittany Christine Fetkin (born February 3, 1988) is an American model, actress, television personality, and  professional wrestler. She is known for her work in WWE's developmental territory, NXT, where she served as a backstage interviewer under the ring name Devin Taylor.

Early life
Fetkin was born in San Diego, California and raised in Temecula, California. She is of Japanese, Lithuanian, and Ukrainian descent. Fetkin is a graduate of Loyola Marymount University with a degree in broadcast journalism. A competitive soccer player since her childhood, Fetkin competed in the Youth World Cup in Sweden and earned scholar athletes honors during her formative years.

Professional wrestling career

WWE (2013–2015) 
Fetkin signed a contract with the professional wrestling promotion WWE in 2013 and was assigned to their developmental territory, NXT, where she was given the ring name Devin Taylor. Taylor debuted as a backstage interviewer on the November 20 episode of NXT. She was also an in-ring competitor at NXT live events, participating mainly in Divas tag team matches.

On October 9, 2015, WWE officially announced that Fetkin was released from her WWE contract, due to injury concerns hampering her training progress. Her release was featured on an episode of WWE Breaking Ground.

Other media
Fetkin is a former print model and has appeared in nationally televised commercial campaigns for NASCAR and Hewlett-Packard. In 2015, Fetkin appeared as a contestant in the nineteenth season of the ABC reality television show The Bachelor. She was eliminated in the first episode.

References

Living people
1988 births
People from San Diego
American female professional wrestlers
American people of Japanese descent
American people of Lithuanian descent
American people of Ukrainian descent
Bachelor Nation contestants
21st-century American women